The House of Commons (Method of Voting and Redistribution of Seats) Act (Northern Ireland) 1929 was an Act of the Parliament of Northern Ireland at Stormont which changed the usual voting system used for the House of Commons of Northern Ireland from single transferable vote (STV) to first past the post (FPTP). As a consequence, the act also subdivided nine of the ten multiple-seat constituencies established by the Government of Ireland Act 1920 into 48 single-seat constituencies. The only exception was the Queen's University constituency, which remained STV until its 1969 abolition. The act was passed in time for the 1929 Stormont election.

The 1929 act has been interpreted by Irish nationalists, at the time and in later years, as an attempt by the Ulster Unionist Party (UUP) to reduce nationalist representation. Dennis Pringle argues that, although gerrymandering and malapportionment at local government level was intended to strengthen Ulster unionist candidates at the expense of nationalism, this was not the case at Stormont, where the unionist majority was secure; instead, the Craigavon ministry's concern was to defend the middle-class UUP against working-class independent unionists and the Northern Ireland Labour Party. These lost more seats than the nationalists at the 1929 election because their support was more evenly spread than the nationalist and unionist parties.

Footnotes

References
Primary
 Stormont Debates: Commons vol.10 
 Second reading:      5  March 1929 cc.427–453; 6 March 1929 cc. 504–559; 7 March 1929 cc. 577–657 (20–13 vote)
 Allocation of time:  15 March 1929 cc.921–982   (21–8  vote)
 Committee stage:    21 March 1929 cc.1115–1201; 22–26 March 1929 cc.1211–1482 
 Third reading:      27 March 1929 cc.1499–1576 (21–10 vote)
 

Secondary

Citations

Acts of the Parliament of Northern Ireland 1929
House of Commons of Northern Ireland
Electoral reform in Northern Ireland
Election law in the United Kingdom